John Salusbury Brewis (13 May 1902 – 1 March 1972) was an English Anglican priest. He was the Principal of St Chad's College, Durham from 1937 to 1947, and the Archdeacon of Doncaster from 1947 to 1954.

Early life and education
Brewis was born on 13 May 1902. He was educated at Eton College, an all-boys public school near Windsor, Berkshire. He studied modern history at Hertford College, Oxford, graduating with a first class honours Bachelor of Arts (BA) degree. He then attended Princeton University as a Henry P. Davison Scholar. He trained for Holy Orders at Cuddesdon College, an Anglo-Catholic theological college near Oxford, Oxfordshire.

Ordained ministry
He was ordained in 1928. He was an Assistant Master at his old school from 1927 to 1929; Vice-Principal and Tutor of St Edmund Hall, Oxford from  1929 to 1937; Principal of St Chad's College, Durham from 1937 to 1947; Vicar of St James' Church, High Melton from 1947 to 1954 (and  Rural Dean of Doncaster during the same period); and  Rector of St James's Church, Piccadilly from 1954 to 1967.

Personal life
In 1935, Brewis married Lady Anne Palmer. Together they had four children: two sons and two daughters. The now Anne Brewis became a noted Botanist.

Brewis died on 1 March 1972, aged 69.

References

External links
 

1902 births
1972 deaths
People educated at Eton College
Alumni of Hertford College, Oxford
Academics of the University of Oxford
Principals of St Chad's College, Durham
Archdeacons of Doncaster
Princeton University alumni
Alumni of Cuddesdon College
Academics of Durham University